Legends of F1, also known as F1 Legends, is a British television programme shown on Sky Sports F1. Steve Rider presents the series of interviews with Formula One legends of the past and present. Sky Sports F1 have also produced a similar series titled Architects of F1, with five episodes featuring Max Mosley, Gordon Murray, Jo Ramírez, John Barnard and Flavio Briatore.

Episode list 
Series 1 (2012)

Series 2 (2013)

Series 3 (2014)

References

External links
F1 Legends at Sky Sports

2010s British sports television series
2012 British television series debuts
English-language television shows
Formula One mass media
Sky Sports
Sky UK original programming